Yankee Boy Basin is an alpine basin in Ouray County, southwestern Colorado. It is in the San Juan Mountains, protected within Uncompahgre National Forest.  

The basin−valley is well renowned for its display of wildflowers during the spring bloom period, and for Twin Falls on Sneffels Creek.

Visiting
Access is provided by a dirt four wheel drive road which branches off the Ouray County road that runs from Ouray to Camp Bird Mine.  The road starts a quarter mile south of Ouray, passes a DOT site, and winds its way up the canyon.

Along the way are several primitive campgrounds that tend to be rarely visited.  These encourage collecting dead-and-down firewood, though, which occasionally brings locals and people visiting other campgrounds.  In general, though, the area is fairly private.

Yankee Boy Basin is a good place to see native wildlife, including:  deer, black bear, birds of prey, and other fauna of the southwestern Rocky Mountains region.

See also
 Chief Ouray

External links
 Yankee Boy Basin - GORP

Valleys of Colorado
Landforms of Ouray County, Colorado
Protected areas of Ouray County, Colorado
San Juan Mountains (Colorado)
Uncompahgre National Forest